Glossa ( meaning "tongue") is a village and a community in the northwestern part of the island of Skopelos in the Northern Sporades. The population in 2011 was 993 for the village and 1,168 for the community, which includes the villages Atheato (pop. 12) and Loutraki (pop. 163). The town's elevation is about 200 meters. Glossa is located 11 km northwest of Skopelos (town).

In 1960, Glossa opened a public primary school, a telephone centre and had 1,842 inhabitants. Before the reorganization of the island government in 1997, Glossa and Klima constituted a separate municipality from Skopelos. Currently Glossa has nursery, primary, secondary and high school. There are also several churches. In the neighborhood of Glossa is the chapel of Agios Ioannis, featured in the 2008 film Mamma Mia!.

References

External links 
 Glossa Village Skopelos

Skopelos
Populated places in the Sporades